Locomotive Services Limited is a train operating company in Great Britain. The company operates rail tours using heritage steam, diesel and electric locomotives with support from associated companies and trusts.

History
In August 2017, Locomotive Services Limited (LSL) was granted an operating licence by the Office of Rail & Road allowing it to operate mainline trains in the United Kingdom. Based at Crewe Diesel TMD, it is owned by Jeremy Hosking. It operated its first tour from Crewe to Kingussie in March 2018.

It built up a fleet of Class 08s, 37s and 47s, mainly acquired from Direct Rail Services. In December 2017, it purchased two Class 55s: D9000 and D9016. The former is being restored at Locomotive Services' Crewe depot, whilst the latter has been cosmetically restored and transferred to the company's One:One Collection facility in Margate.

In August 2018, preserved Class 40 D213 Andania joined Locomotive Services on a three-year lease. In 2020, a Class 86, Class 87, two Class 90s and an InterCity 125 set were purchased.

Related companies, brands, and trusts

Hosking formed Locomotive Services under Royal Scot Locomotive and General Trust (RSLGT), a company dedicated to the maintenance and operation of steam locomotives owned by the trust, and also a number of other engines owned by Hosking. The company initially operated from a main base at Southall Railway Centre and also a summer outpost at Bristol Barton Hill.

LNWR Heritage Ltd
In 2013, RSLGT acquired LNWR Heritage, a company specialising in the overhaul and restoration of steam locomotives, from Pete Waterman. Subsequently, merged into Locomotive Services in 2015, RSLGT came to an agreement with Network Rail to lease the former Crewe TMD close to LNWR Heritage's former base, which resultantly became Locomotive Services' main base. Having previously had locomotive overhauls undertaken by various companies across the UK, investment in Crewe TMD allows Locomotive Services to fully restore and maintain RSLGT's locomotive and coaching stock.

Locomotive Diesels Ltd 
Already formed under Locomotive Services to handle operations and maintenance of RSLGT's stock of Class 47 locomotives, which were purchased to assist and move both steam locomotives and coaching stock around the UK network, the division took more prominence after Hosking agreed to acquire two Class 55 Deltic locomotives in November 2017. In January 2018, Locomotive Services announced that they had taken out a three-year loan agreement on a Class 40 locomotive D213 to operate on the mainline in the later half of 2018.

Locomotive Storage Ltd
After acquiring the former Hornby factory in Margate, Kent, the Trust formed Locomotive Storage Ltd, to enable safe and weather-secure storage of locomotives awaiting overhaul, away from the busy main site at Crewe. After refurbishment and the installation of seven tracks (the site is only accessible by road), the first stock to arrive on the site was a Class 503 in May 2018, followed by former LNER Class A4 4464 Bittern on 1 June 2018.

Train operating company
In August 2017, the associated company Locomotive Services (TOC) Ltd obtained the required certifications, licence and agreements to become a UK train operating company (TOC) enabling the company to operate trains on the mainline network. The first tour was operated from Crewe to Kingussie in March 2018. It subsequently created the associated company Saphos Trains which runs tours and excursions, starting and ending mainly at present from Crewe railway station. Two Class 90s and an InterCity 125 set were purchased from Porterbrook.

Royal Scot Locomotive and General Trust

The Royal Scot Locomotive and General Trust owns several locomotives that are now available to be operated by Locomotive Services.

The Steam Dreams Rail Company
In June 2022, it was announced that Locomotive Services had purchased Steam Dreams and LNER Thompson Class B1 61306 from former owner David Buck. Steam Dreams now operates under the LSL umbrella, with the operator continuing to operate its own tours too.

Train Operating Company
LSL provides locomotives, stock and crews for railtour organisers. LSL acts as train operating company to the following companies:
 InterCity (Diesel/Electric Tours)
 Blue Pullman (Midland Pullman, HST)
 Saphos Trains (Steam Tours)
 Statesman Rail (Diesel Tours)
 Steam Dreams (Steam Tours) (Company acquired in June 2022 & operations transferred from West Coast Railways)

References

External links

Company website

Crewe
Post-privatisation British railway companies
Railway companies established in 2018
Train operating companies in the United Kingdom
2018 establishments in England
British companies established in 2018